Niyaz Anvarovich Ilyasov (born 10 August 1995) is a Russian judoka of Turkish Meskhetian heritage.

He participated at the 2018 World Judo Championships, winning a medal.

References

External links
 
 
 

1995 births
Living people
Russian male judoka
Russian people of Turkish descent
Meskhetian Turkish people
Medalists at the 2020 Summer Olympics
Judoka at the 2020 Summer Olympics
Olympic medalists in judo
Olympic bronze medalists for the Russian Olympic Committee athletes
Olympic judoka of Russia
People from Bataysk
Sportspeople from Rostov Oblast